Gary Hulmes (born 28 February 1958) is a former English footballer who played as a forward.

He began his professional football career with Rochdale, where he played for two seasons before being released by the club in 1976.

He was then signed for Sligo Rovers by manager Billy Sinclair and went on to enjoy a successful career in Ireland with Rovers and Limerick.

References

1958 births
Living people
English footballers
Association football defenders
Rochdale A.F.C. players
Sligo Rovers F.C. players
Limerick F.C. players
English Football League players
League of Ireland players